Journy is a commune in the Pas-de-Calais département in the Hauts-de-France region of France.

Geography
Journy is a village situated 10 miles (16 km) west of Saint-Omer, on the D191 road. The area around the village was once a heath called Les Dornes, which regularly caught fire along the railway line from Anvin to Calais, perhaps as a result of sparks from the engine.

Population

Places of interest
 The church of St.Omer, dating from the sixteenth century.

See also
Communes of the Pas-de-Calais department

References

Communes of Pas-de-Calais